Acne is acneiform eruptions. It is usually used as a synonym for acne vulgaris (common acne), but may also refer to:

Medicine
Acne aestivalis, a special kind of polymorphous light eruption induced by ultra violet A radiation
Acne conglobata, a highly inflammatory disease presenting with comedones, nodules, abscesses, and draining sinus tracts
Acne cosmetica, acne caused by or aggravated by cosmetics
Acne fulminans, a severe form of acne
Acne keloidalis nuchae, a destructive scarring folliculitis that occurs almost exclusively on the occipital scalp of people of African descent, primarily men
Acne mechanica, an acneiform eruption observed after repetitive physical trauma to the skin such as rubbing from clothing or sports equipment
Acne medicamentosa (drug-induced acne) (e.g., steroid acne)
Acne miliaris necrotica, a rare condition consisting of follicular vesicopustules, sometimes occurring as solitary lesions that are usually very itchy
Acne necrotica, primary lesions that are pruritic or painful erythematous follicular-based papules that develop central necrosis and crusting and heal with a varioliform scar
Acne rosacea, a red rash predominantly on the face
Acne vulgaris (common acne)
Baby acne, a rash seen on the cheeks, chin, and forehead of infants
Blackheads
Chloracne, an acne-like eruption of blackheads, cysts, and pustules associated with exposure to certain halogenated aromatic compounds, such as chlorinated dioxins and dibenzofurans
Excoriated acne, mild acne accompanied by extensive excoriations caused by scratching or squeezing pimples
Halogen acne, caused by iodides, bromides and fluorides (halogens) that induce an acneiform eruption similar to that observed with steroids
Hidradenitis suppurativa, chronic abscesses or boils of sweat glands and hair follicles; in the underarms, groin and buttocks, and under the breasts in women
Infantile acne/Neonatal acne
Lupus miliaris disseminatus faciei
Occupational acne
Oil acne
Pomade acne, affecting the forehead due to misapplication of hairstyling product
Pseudofolliculitis barbae (Acne keloidalis nuchae), a rash caused by shaving
Tar acne, caused by exposure to tars used in industry
Tropical acne, unusually severe acne occurring in the tropics during seasons when the weather is hot and humid
Tycoon's cap, acne necrotica miliaris, a disease of the scalp

Other uses
 Acne Studios, a Swedish fashion house
Acne (film), a 2008 Uruguayan film directed by Federico Veiroj

See also
 Acme (disambiguation)